Colonel Edward Orlando Kellett  (19 May 1902 – 22 March 1943) was an English Member of Parliament and British Army officer who was killed in action during the fighting in Tunisia during the Second World War.

The son of Major-General Richard Orlando Kellett,
Kellett graduated from the Royal Military College, Sandhurst, and was commissioned as a second lieutenant into the Irish Guards on 1 February 1923. In 1928 he was confirmed as a lieutenant in the reserves. On 1 March 1930 he transferred to the Territorial Army (TA) as a lieutenant in the Sherwood Rangers Yeomanry.  By 1939 he was a major and in May 1939 was elected as Member of Parliament for Birmingham Aston. He was also a big game hunter.
The Second World War saw Kellett fighting in Tunisia as a colonel of the Royal Armoured Corps. He was killed in March 1943, aged 40, during the fighting in North Africa and is buried in Sfax War Cemetery.

References

External links 

1943 deaths
Irish military personnel
Royal Armoured Corps officers
British Army personnel killed in World War II
Graduates of the Royal Military College, Sandhurst
Conservative Party (UK) MPs for English constituencies
UK MPs 1935–1945
Irish Guards officers
Sherwood Rangers Yeomanry officers
1902 births
Burials at Sfax War Cemetery